Stanislav Gnedko (born 7 January 1987) is a Belarusian professional footballer.

On 6 August 2020, the BFF banned Gnedko from Belarusian football for 2 years for his involvement in the match fixing.

References

External links

Profile at teams.by

1987 births
Living people
Belarusian footballers
Association football midfielders
Belarusian expatriate footballers
Expatriate footballers in Armenia
FC Dinamo-Juni Minsk players
FC Molodechno players
FC Torpedo-BelAZ Zhodino players
FC Belshina Bobruisk players
FC Volna Pinsk players
FC Veras Nesvizh players
FC Gorodeya players
FC Granit Mikashevichi players
FC Slutsk players
FC Alashkert players
FC Smorgon players
FC Lida players